Rhyzodiastes exsequiae is a species of ground beetle in the subfamily Rhysodinae. It was described by R.T. Bell and J.R. Bell in 2009. It is known from northwestern Amazonas State, Brazil, between the Venezuelan border and Rio Negro.

Rhyzodiastes exsequiae measure  in length.

References

Rhyzodiastes
Beetles of South America
Insects of Brazil
Endemic fauna of Brazil
Beetles described in 2009